Grace Halsell (May 7, 1923 – August 16, 2000) was an American journalist and writer.

Early life and education 
The daughter of writer Harry H. Halsell, she studied at Texas Tech University from 1939 to 1942. During the 1940s, she was briefly married to Andy Fournier, the chief of detectives in the Fort Worth Police Department.

Career 
Halsell worked for several newspapers between 1942 and 1965, including the Lubbock Avalanche-Journal, the Fort Worth Star-Telegram, and the Washington bureau of the Houston Post. She covered both the Korean and Vietnam Wars as a reporter, and was a White House speech writer for President Lyndon B. Johnson from 1965 to 1968. She wrote 10 books, including the critically acclaimed and controversial Soul Sister for which she took pills used to alleviate pigmentation problems in order to darken skin and pass as black, and Journey to Jerusalem about Christian, Jewish, and Muslim families in the Holy Land.

Death 
In 2000, she died in Washington, D.C. of complications from treatment for multiple myeloma. She bequeathed her papers to the Mary Couts Burnett Library at Texas Christian University in Fort Worth, Texas. Some of her work is housed at Boston University's Howard Gotlieb Archival Research Center.

Books 
 
 
 
 
 
 
 
 
 
 
 Revised and enlarged edition 2003  included transcript of CBS 60 Minutes episode broadcast October 6, 2002  "Zion's Christian soldiers; how conservative Christians see Israel's role in bringing on the Second Coming of Christ."

References

External links 
 Excerpt from Prophecy and Politics

1923 births
2000 deaths
Texas Tech University alumni
Texas Christian University alumni
Columbia University alumni
University of Paris alumni
Deaths from multiple myeloma
Deaths from cancer in Washington, D.C.
20th-century American women writers
American women journalists
American women non-fiction writers
Journalists from Texas
20th-century American journalists
American expatriates in France